

References

1983
Soviet
Films